The 2012 Cooper Challenger was a professional tennis tournament played on outdoor clay courts. It was the 5th edition of the tournament and part of the 2012 ITF Women's Circuit, offering a total of $50,000 in prize money. It took place in Waterloo, Ontario, Canada between July 9 and July 15, 2012.

Singles main draw entrants

Seeds

1 Rankings are as of June 25, 2012

Other entrants
The following players received wildcards into the singles main draw:
 Élisabeth Abanda
 Marianne Jodoin
 Sonja Molnar
 Stephanie Wetmore

The following players received entry from the qualifying draw:
 Veronica Corning
 Sherazad Benamar
 Sandra Dynka
 Erin Clark

Champions

Singles

 Sharon Fichman def.  Julia Glushko, 6–3, 6–2

Doubles

 Sharon Fichman /  Marie-Ève Pelletier def.  Shuko Aoyama /  Gabriela Dabrowski, 6–2, 7–5

External links
Official website

Cooper Challenger
Waterloo Challenger
Cooper Challenger